Podocnemididae is a family of pleurodire (side-necked) turtles, once widely distributed. Most of its 20 genera and 30 species are now extinct. Seven of its eight surviving species are native to South America: the genus Peltocephalus, with only one species (P. dumerilianus, the big-headed Amazon River turtle); and the genus Podocnemis, with six living species of South American side-necked river turtles. There is also one genus native to Madagascar: Erymnochelys, the Madagascan big-headed turtle, whose single species E. madagascariensis. 

Like other pleurodire turtles, podocs have a "side-necked" defensive posture, turning the head sideways to hide it under the shell. Another characteristic of pleurodires is that the pelvis is fused to the shell which prevents pelvic motion, making it difficult to walk on land. Podocnemididae turtles live in aquatic environments and have shells streamlined to aid in swimming.

Taxonomy and systematics

According to Ferreira et al. (2015), the family name derives from two Greek words: "podos" (foot) and "cnemis" (leg armor worn by Roman soldiers.)

To clarify some closely related names: 
 Podocnemidae (Baur, 1893) is an alternate but less commonly-used name for the same biological group as family Podocnemididae (Cope, 1868).
 Epifamily Podocnemidinura: The family Podocnemididae has two sister families (Hamadachelys and Brasilemys); the relationship of these three families is sometimes recognized by grouping them as the epifamily Podocnemidinura. 
 Superfamily Podocnemidoidea: At a higher level yet, the epifamily Podocnemidinura is grouped with the family Bothremydidae to form the superfamily Podocnemidoidea.
 Podocnemidinae: An earlier classification, rejected by Gaffney, treated Podocnemididae as a subfamily (Podocnemidinae) within the closely related family Pelomedusidae.)

According to Gaffney et al. (2011), the family Podocnemididae can be diagnosed from its  cranial traits including "the unique possession of a cavum pterygoidei formed by the basisphenoid, pterygoid, prootic, and quadrate [bones], underlain by the pterygoid and basisphenoid." 

The pocnemid family dates to the late Cretaceous; it includes 20 genera and 30 species. Only three genera (and eight species) survive.

The three living genera of Podocnemididae (two of them monotypic) are:
 Erymnochelys – Madagascan big-headed turtle
 Peltocephalus – big-headed Amazon River turtle
 Podocnemis – South American side-necked river turtles

Taxonomy 
Fossils show that Podocnemidids were once found in Europe, Asia, North America, and Africa. Stupendemys lived around 5.5 million years ago in northern South America, and was the largest freshwater turtle with a carapace length of 2.4 metres, the largest of any known turtle and is the largest pleurodire known.

Genera:

 Stem group taxa (Podocnemidoidae)
†Brasilemys Romualdo Formation, Brazil, Early Cretaceous (Albian)
†Amabilis São José do Rio Preto Formation, Brazil, Late Cretaceous (Santonian)
†Hamadachelys Kem Kem Group, Morocco, Late Cretaceous (Cenomanian)
†Portezueloemys Portezuelo Formation, Argentina, Late Cretaceous (Turonian)
†Cambaremys Marília Formation, Brazil, Late Cretaceous (Maastrichtian)
†Bauruemys Presidente Prudente Formation, Brazil, Late Cretaceous (Campanian)
†Roxochelys Adamantina Formation, Brazil, Campanian
Family †Peiropemydidae
†Peiropemys Marília Formation, Brazil, Maastrichtian
 †Pricemys Marília Formation, Brazil, Maastrichtian
†Lapparentemys Santa Lucía Formation, Bolivia, Paleocene
†Yuraramirim Adamantina Formation, Brazil, Campanian
 Family Podocnemididae (crown group)
†Caninemys Northern South America, Miocene
Subfamily Podocnemidinae
 †Cerrejonemys Cerrejón Formation, Colombia, Paleocene
Podocnemis South America, Miocene-Recent
Subfamily Erymnochelyinae
†Gestemys Geste Formation, Argentina, Eocene
†Stupendemys Northern South America, Miocene
†Carbonemys Cerrejón Formation, Colombia, Paleocene
Peltocephalus Northern South America, Recent
Erymnochelyini (formerly the "Erymnochelys group")
 †Apeshemys (formerly "Podocnemis" aegyptiaca) Egypt, Early Miocene
 †Eocenochelus Eocene, Europe
Erymnochelys Madagascar, Recent
 †Shetwemys (formerly "Podocnemis" fajumensis) Jebel Qatrani Formation, Egypt, Oligocene Shumaysi Formation, Saudi Arabia, Oligocene
 †Turkanemys Kenya, Miocene-Pliocene
 †Kenyemys Kenya, Miocene-Pliocene
 Stereogenyina
 †Stereogenys cromeri Qasr el Sagha Formation, Egypt, Late Eocene
 †Andrewsemys (formerly "Stereogenys" libyca) Egypt, Late Eocene-Early Oligocene
 †Cordichelys Egypt, Late Eocene
 †Lemurchelys Moghara Formation, Egypt, Early Miocene
 †"Podocnemis" bramlyi Moghara Formation, Egypt, Early Miocene
 †Latentemys Egypt, Miocene
 †Bairdemys Late Oligocene-Miocene, Americas
 †Brontochelys Bugti Hills, Pakistan Early Miocene
 †Shweboemys Pliocene-Pleistocene, Myanmar
†Piramys India, Late Miocene
 Incertae sedis
 †Neochelys Eocene, Europe
 †"Stereogenys" podocnemoides Qasr el Sagha Formation, Egypt, Late Eocene
 †Dacquemys Birket Qarun Formation, Egypt, Late Eocene, Jebel Qatrani Formation, Egypt, Early Oligocene
 †Albertwoodemys Jebel Qatrani Formation, Egypt, Oligocene
 †Mogharemys Moghara Formation, Egypt, Early Miocene
†Ragechelus Farin-Doutchi Formation, Niger, Maastrichtian

References

External links

 
Turtle families
Taxa named by Edward Drinker Cope
Danian first appearances
Extant Danian first appearances